Hot air may refer to:

 Heat
 A lie, exaggeration, nonsense
 Hot air (economics)
 Hot Air, an American conservative political blog
 Hot Air (film), a 2019 American comedy-drama film directed by Frank Coraci
 HOTAIR, a human gene (short for "HOX transcript antisense RNA")

See also
 Hot air airship
 Hot air balloon
 Hot air boat
 Hot air engine
 Hot air gun
 Hot air oven
 Hot air reflow
 Hot Air Club
 The Hot Air Salesman, 1937 Fleischer Studios animated short film
 Into Hot Air, 2007 book by Chris Elliott